Menegazzia primaria is a species of foliose lichen found in Taiwan. It is closely related to Menegazzia terebrata.

See also
 List of Menegazzia species

References

primaria
Lichen species
Lichens described in 2003
Lichens of Asia
Taxa named by André Aptroot